Washington Bushnell (September 20, 1825 – June 30, 1885) was an American lawyer and politician.

Born in Madison County, New York, Bushnell and his family moved to Kendall County, Illinois and settled in Lisbon, Illinois. In 1853, Bushnell graduated from the State and National Law School in Poughkeepsie, New York and was admitted to the New York bar. He moved to Ottawa, Illinois, in 1853, and practiced law. Bushnell served as Ottawa city attorney and as LaSalle County, Illinois state attorney. From 1860 to 1864, Bushnell served in the Illinois State Senate and was a Republican. From 1869 to 1873, Bushnell served as Illinois Attorney General. In 1880, Bushnell was a candidate for the United States House of Representatives and lost the nomination. Bushnell died of heart failure at his home in Ottawa, Illinois.

Notes

1825 births
1885 deaths
People from Madison County, New York
People from Ottawa, Illinois
State and National Law School alumni
Illinois lawyers
New York (state) lawyers
Illinois Attorneys General
Republican Party Illinois state senators
People from Kendall County, Illinois
19th-century American politicians
19th-century American lawyers